The Bombay Courier was an English language newspaper, first printed in 1790 in Bombay, India by William Ashburner. It followed the Bombay Herald (later renamed the Bombay Gazette), founded in 1789. In 1847, it merged with the Bombay Telegraph to form the Telegraph and Courier.

References
Bombay courier.
Glimpses of Old Bombay and Western India, with Other Papers

History of Mumbai
English-language newspapers published in India
Publications established in 1790
1790 establishments in British India
Publications disestablished in 1847
1847 disestablishments in the British Empire
1847 disestablishments in Asia